Oneum was an Illyrian settlement of the Delmatae.

The probable location of Oneum is today's Omiš.

See also 
List of ancient cities in Illyria

References

External links

Illyria and Illyrians

Former populated places in the Balkans
Cities in ancient Illyria
Omiš
Illyrian Croatia